Los Danzantes de Levanto is a typical dance from the Amazonas Region, Peru.

They wear a white shirt of wide and long sleeves, a black vest adorned with red ribbons and black trousers. They also wear a crown of showy peacock's feathers. Their presence is important in all the big celebrations of the region.

Other well-known dances that are performed in diverse localities are:
 the "Conchiperla", in which the man gives a handkerchief to his partner keeping a knee in the ground and if he doesn't do it, a glass of liqueur must be drunk in punishment,
 the "Trapichillo", danced by four couples grabbed by the right hands and turning around from right to left side,
 the "Quinsamana", in which insults and compliments are mixed.

References 

Culture of Amazonas Region
Peruvian dances
Native American dances